Martin Taylor, MBE (born 20 October 1956) is a British jazz guitarist who has performed solo, in groups, guitar ensembles, and as an accompanist.

Biography

Early life
Taylor was born in Harlow, Essex, into a family with a musical heritage and a Gypsy tradition. At the age of four, he received his first guitar from his father, jazz bassist William 'Buck' Taylor who only took up music at 30. Buck frequently played the music of the Quintette du Hot Club de France, so the young Martin Taylor became inspired by guitarist Django Reinhardt. At age eight, he was already playing in his father's band and at 15 he quit school to become a professional musician.

The band Martin joined at 15 called the Oo-yah Band was led by Lennie Hastings, a jazz drummer who spent many years with the Alex Welsh band. The band included Nick Stevenson (trumpet), Peter Skivington (bass guitar), Ron Brown (trombone), Jamie Evans (piano), Malcolm Everson (clarinet and baritone saxophone).

Over the next few years Taylor played in numerous bands, at holiday camps, on radio, and on cruise ships. One cruise gig led to his playing with the Count Basie orchestra. Performing dates in and around London brought him into contact with jazz guitarist Ike Isaacs, who became a mentor. Isaacs not only performed with Taylor as a duet, but also helped Taylor develop his sense of jazz harmony and fingerstyle technique.

The Grappelli years
Through Isaacs, Taylor was introduced to Stéphane Grappelli, former violinist of the Quintette du Hot Club de France, in which he played with Django Reinhardt. When one of Grappelli's band members was injured, Taylor was invited to play a few European dates. When Grappelli invited him to join full-time, Taylor accepted and performed and recorded with him for the next eleven years, occupying the position once held by his idol, Django Reinhardt.

His success with Grappelli allowed Taylor more freedom. He reduced some of his commitments and moved to Scotland. Another benefit of his association with Grappelli was that he began to tour North America regularly, helping him reach a larger audience and build new relationships. He met Chet Atkins and David Grisman and recorded with them in later years. Another contact financed the production of the album Sarabanda.

In the 1980s, Grappelli suffered a heart attack. Although he made a full recovery, it was some time before he could tour again. Taylor found it difficult to find other work and fell into a period of financial hardship, selling his guitars to survive. He became disenchanted with music and did not touch a guitar for almost a year. He agreed on a price for his one remaining guitar, a gift from mentor Isaacs. On the way to close the deal, he pulled his car over to play the guitar one last time, and found his passion for playing re-ignited. He called off the deal. This was a catalyst for the next stage of his career.

Going solo
To avoid relying on other musicians for income, Taylor started to perform as a solo act. His style and engaging stage personality paid off, and the gigs proved successful. After a few years, he stopped touring with Grappelli.  A recording contract with Scottish label Linn Records, helped make it possible for him to concentrate on his solo career. Linn was primarily a manufacturer of high-end audio equipment, and found that Taylor's intimate and intricate style and tone ably demonstrated the quality of their equipment. These Linn recordings include solo work (Artistry and Portraits, which featured Chet Atkins) and some recordings with a modern jazz quartet (Don't Fret). The relative success of these albums and his concert dates raised Taylor's profile in the guitar community.

In 1991, Taylor performed in Australia, giving a solo performance on the Hey Hey It's Saturday show. Guitarist Tommy Emmanuel saw him on the show and contacted him, and the two became close friends and frequent collaborators. Taylor has stated that although their backgrounds were different, they shared many similarities and found that they had been living parallel lives on opposite sides of the world.

Spirit of Django and other associations

During the 1990s, Taylor started the band Spirit of Django, which was inspired by Django Reinhardt and the Hot Club. He recorded and toured successfully with this band while continuing his solo commitments. At the end of the decade he signed with Sony Music, releasing two albums, Kiss and Tell and Nitelife. After leaving Sony, he signed with P3 Music, which released Solo and The Valley with guest appearances by Bryn Terfel and Sacha Distel.

At a celebration for the film Stéphane Grappelli: A Life in the Jazz Century, Taylor performed with associates of Grappelli, including John Etheridge, Jack Emblow, and Coleridge Goode. Since 2010, Taylor has been teaching guitar on his online school.

Influences
His earliest influence was gypsy jazz guitarist Django Reinhardt from the Hot Club of France. Other influences include mentor Ike Isaacs, Ted Greene, Kenny Burrell, Wes Montgomery, and Joe Pass. Although Taylor is inspired by many guitarists, musically he relates more to pianists, particularly Art Tatum.

Taylor's set lists include songs from the Great American Songbook and his own compositions. His arrangements and compositions are often influenced by composers like Nelson Riddle and Duke Ellington and therefore include moving lines to fill in the spaces, e.g. walking basslines, syncopated chordal 'stabs' (to emulate horn sections), and complex jazz harmony. He considers melody the most important part of an arrangement.

Equipment

Martin Taylor often uses guitars built by Scottish-based luthier Mike Vanden. They produced the Martin Taylor Artistry archtop with another, nylon-stringed, archtop used for Spirit of Django. Throughout the 1990s he played a Yamaha AEX1500, which he helped develop. In 2012, Peerless guitars announced the release of two guitars endorsed by Martin. In 2018, in collaboration with UK based premium hand-crafted guitar specialist, Fibonacci Guitars (https://www.fibonacciguitars.com), the Martin Taylor branded "Joya" guitar was launched  (https://martintaylorguitars.com/joya-op2/) followed in 2022 by the slightly smaller and thinner "Lola" model (https://www.fibonacciguitars.com/martin-taylor-lola)

Awards and honors
Member of the Order of the British Empire, awarded by Queen Elizabeth II (2002)

Discography

As leader
 Taylor Made (Wave, 1979)
 Skye Boat (Concord Jazz, 1982)
 Sarabanda (Gaia, 1989)
 Don't Fret! (Linn, 1990)
 Change of Heart (Linn, 1991)
 Gordon Giltrap & Martin Taylor (Prestige, 1991)
 Artistry (Linn, 1992)
 Spirit of Django (Linn, 1994)
 Tone Poems 2 with David Grisman (Acoustic Disc, 1995)
 Portraits (Linn, 1996)
 Two's Company (Linn, 1997)
 Triple Libra with Peter Ind (Wave, 1998)
 Gypsy (Linn, 1998)
 Kiss and Tell (Columbia, 1999)
 I'm Beginning to See the Light with David Grisman (Acoustic Disc, 1999)
 Martin Taylor in Concert (Milestone/Fantasy, 2000)
 Sketches: A Tribute to Art Tatum (P3 Music, 2001)
 Nitelife (Columbia, 2001)
 Solo (P3 Music, 2002)
 Gypsy Journey (P3 Music, 2003)
 The Valley (P3 Music, 2004)
 Martins4 (P3 Music, 2005)
 Freternity (P3 Music, 2007)
 Double Standards (P3 Music, 2008)
 Last Train to Hauteville (P3 Music, 2010)
 Two for the Road with Alan Barnes (Woodville, 2011)
 Live at Wigmore Hall with David Grisman (Acoustic Disc, 2011)
 First Time Together! with David Grisman, Frank Vignola (Acoustic Disc, 2012)
 One Day (P3 Music, 2015)

As sideman
With Buddy DeFranco
 On Tour UK: Buddy DeFranco Quartet Featuring Martin Taylor (Hep, 1984)
 Groovin (Hep, 1985)
 Garden of Dreams (ProJazz, 1988)

With Stephane Grappelli
 Vintage 1981 (Concord Jazz, 1981)
 At the Winery (Concord Jazz, 1981)
 We've Got the World On a String (Angel, 1982)
 Just One of Those Things (EMI, 1984)
 Bringing It Together (Cymekob, 1984)
 Live in San Francisco (Storyville, 1986)
 Together at Last (Flying Fish, 1987)
 Olympia 1988 (Atlantic, 1988)
 Stephane Grappelli Plays Jerome Kern (GRP, 1987)
 Milou en Mai (CBS, 1990)
 Reunion (Linn, 1993)
 Celebrating Grappelli (Honest, 1997)
 Live at the Cambridge Folk Festival (True North/Fuel 2000, 1999)
With Karl Jenkins
 Adiemus IV The Eternal Knot (Venture/Virgin, 2000)
 Live (Venture, 2001)
 Vocalise (OmTown/Virgin, 2003)

With Yehudi Menuhin
 Strictly for the Birds (Angel, 1980)
 Top Hat (His Master's Voice, 1984)
 For All Seasons (EMI, 1985)
 Menuhin & Grappelli Play Jealousy & Other Great Standards (EMI, 1988)

With Bill Wyman
 Anyway the Wind Blows (BMG/RCA, 1998)
 Struttin' Our Stuff (BMG/RCA, 1997)
 Groovin (Roadrunner/Papillon/Ripple, 2000)
 Live in Europe (Ripple, 2000)
 Double Bill (Disky, 2001)
 Travlin' Band (Ripple, 2002)
 On the Road Again (Ripple, 2003)
 Just for a Thrill (Ripple, 2004)
 The Kings of Rhythm Vol. 1: Jump, Jive and Wail (Edsel, 2016)

With others
 Tommy Emmanuel "The Colonel and the Governor" (BMG 2013)
 Denys Baptiste, Alternating Currents (Dune, 2001)
 Teresa Brewer, On the Road Again (Doctor Jazz, 1983)
 Teresa Brewer, American Music Box Vol. 1 The Songs of Irving Berlin (Doctor Jazz, 1987)
 Elkie Brooks, Live with Friends (Eventful Music, 2006)
 Chas and Dave, That's What Happens (Warner 2013)
 Jaki Graham, Heaven Knows (EMI, 1985)
 David Grisman, David Grisman's Acoustic Christmas (Rounder, 1983)
 David Grisman, Dawg Jazz & Dawg Grass (Warner Bros., 1983)
 Peter Ind, Jazz Bass Baroque (Wave, 1988)
 Kiri Te Kanawa, Kiri Sings Karl (EMI, 2006)
 Paul Kelly and the Coloured Girls, Gossip (Mushroom, 1986)
 Carol Kidd, All My Tomorrows (Aloi, 1985)
 Didier Lockwood, Waltz Club (EmArcy, 2006)
 Didier Lockwood, For Stephane (Ames, 2008)
 Claire Martin, Off Beat (Linn, 1995)
 Courtney Pine, Journey to the Urge Within (Antilles, 1986)
 Prefab Sprout, Andromeda Heights (Kitchenware/Columbia, 1997)
 Spike Robinson, London Reprise (Capri, 1984)
 Bryn Terfel, Bryn (Deutsche Grammophon, 2003)

References

External links
Official website

1956 births
20th-century British guitarists
21st-century British guitarists
Bill Wyman's Rhythm Kings members
English jazz guitarists
English male guitarists
Fingerstyle guitarists
Living people
Members of the Order of the British Empire
People from Harlow
20th-century British male musicians
21st-century British male musicians
British male jazz musicians
Columbia Records artists